David J. Clark is a Canadian musician from Etobicoke, Ontario.

Official Biography 2023
Dave Clark is a Gemini award winning musician who has spent over three decades composing, performing, and recording original music. Dave is a multi- instrumentalist, vocalist, conductor, music producer, poet, educator, author, mastering engineer, and the leader of both the Woodshed Orchestra and the WoodChopperʼs Association improviserʼs orchestra.
Dave has worked with singer/songwriter Gord Downie of the Tragically Hip (Can), guitarist Kevin Breit (Can), producer Chris Walla of Death Cab For Cutie (USA),
drummer Neil Peart of Rush (Can), the Rheostatics band (Can), beatboxer Shlomo (UK), poet Jim Carroll (USA), griot Mansa Sissoko (Mali, West Africa), singer/songwriter Ron Sexsmith (Can), the Dinner is Ruined Band (Can), singer/songwriter Amanda Rhaeume (Can), the Sun Ra Arkestra (USA), trumpeter Rebecca Hennessy (Can), poet Lemn Sissay (UK), singer/songwriter Jane Siberry singer/songwriter Sarah Harmer (Can), dancer/choroegrapher Andrea Nann (Can), guitarist Andy Moor of the Ex (Netherlands),, author Paul Quarrington (Can), spoken word artist Paul Dutton (Can), photographer Dave Blumenfeld (Israel), painter/musician Matt James (Can), saxophonist Joanne Hetu (Can), music group Bellowhead (UK), saxophonist John Oswald (Can), singer/ngoni Jah Youssouf (Mali, West Africa), installation artists Fastwurms (Can), dancer Gauri Sharma Tripathi (UK), bassist/composer Michael Herring (Can), actress/musician Sook Yin Lee (Can), bata master Gilberto Morales Choing (Cuba), saxophonist Jean Derome (Can), singer/songwriter Robyn Hitchcock (UK), musician/producer Joe Lapinski (Can), saxophonist Alain Derbez (Mex), filmmaker Bey Weyman (Can), pianist Achim Kaufmann (Netherlands), singer/songwriter Suzie Vinnick (Can), violinist Jagdish Mistry (Ger), musician Stephen Fearing (Can), poet Lebo Mashille (South Africa), percussionist Colin Currie (UK), the Nihilist Spasm band (Can), artistic director Jude Kelly (UK), installation artists Camilla Singh and Sherri Hay (Can), ngoni player Abdoulaye Kone (Mali, West Africa), singer Julie Doiron (Can), singer Mica Levi (UK), Charles Spearin and the Happiness Project band (Can) and cellist Oliver Coates (UK), Choreographer Jennifer Goodwin (Can), saxophonist Michael Blake (USA), singer/songwriter Mary Margaret OʼHara (Can), accordionist Michael Ward - Bergeman (USA), guitarist Alex Lifeson of Rush (Can), amongst many others.

References

External links
The WoodChopper's Association
Rheostatics

Year of birth missing (living people)
Living people
Canadian rock drummers
Canadian male drummers
Canadian songwriters
20th-century Canadian poets
20th-century Canadian male writers
Canadian male poets
Musicians from Toronto
Writers from Toronto
Canadian indie rock musicians
People from Etobicoke
Place of birth missing (living people)
Rheostatics members